Over the Garden Wall is a 1934 British musical romantic comedy film directed by John Daumery and starring Bobby Howes, Marian Marsh and Margaret Bannerman.

Synopsis
A young man and a woman exchange glances through the windows of their passing trains. They later discover that they are staying in neighboring houses, but their respective families are feuding and they are only occasionally able to continue their romance across the garden wall. Eventually, they decide to elope together but this only leads to more trouble than it is worth.

Cast
 Bobby Howes as Bunny 
 Marian Marsh as Mary  
 Margaret Bannerman as Diana 
 Viola Lyel as Gladys  
 Bertha Belmore as Jennifer 
 Syd Crossley as Podds  
 Mary Sheridan as Tilda  
 Freddie Watts as Thorold

Stewart Granger and Henry B. Longhurst appear in minor roles.

Production
The film was based on a play The Youngest of Three by H. F. Maltby, who co-wrote the screenplay. It was made at Elstree Studios with sets designed by art director David Rawnsley. Marian Marsh was imported from Hollywood where she had starred in major productions such as Svengali. while Howes was a popular British star of stage musicals who appeared in several films during the decade.

References

Bibliography
Low, Rachael. Filmmaking in 1930s Britain. George Allen & Unwin, 1985.
 Warren, Patricia. Elstree: The British Hollywood. Columbus Books, 1988.
Wood, Linda. British Films, 1927–1939. British Film Institute, 1986.

External links

1934 films
British romantic comedy films
British black-and-white films
British musical comedy films
1934 romantic comedy films
1934 musical comedy films
Films directed by Jean Daumery
Films shot at British International Pictures Studios
Films set in England
Films set in London
Films shot in England
British films based on plays
1930s romantic musical films
1930s English-language films
1930s British films